The European Union National Institutes for Culture (EUNIC) is a network of European national institutes of culture and national bodies engaged in cultural and related activities beyond their national borders. EUNIC brings together organizations from all 27 EU member states and adds value through its global network of clusters. By pooling together the resources and expertise of its members and carrying out joint work on common areas of interest, EUNIC is a recognized partner of the EU and its stakeholders in defining and implementing European policy on culture inside and outside the EU.

Organization
The overarching purpose of EUNIC is to create effective partnerships and networks between the participating organizations, to improve and promote cultural diversity and understanding between European societies, and to strengthen international dialogue and co-operation with countries outside Europe.

Since its establishment in 2006, EUNIC has evolved into a strong network delivering transnational collaborative projects worldwide through its 36 members and 103 clusters. Members consist of national cultural institutions or organizations. Clusters are collaboration platforms established where at least 3 local offices of EUNIC members operate together. Clusters can operate nationwide or citywide. A EUNIC cluster represents the whole of EUNIC and not only those members present in a country or location.

On 16 May 2017, during the Danish Presidency of EUNIC and the European Union signed an administrative agreement that outlines joint principles, values and objectives for cooperation, as well as practical arrangements for its implementation.

The Presidents are supported by the EUNIC Global office team based in Brussels. The EUNIC Global Office in Brussels also supports the work of EUNIC members and clusters around the world.

Management
EUNIC is managed by a bi-annual meeting of the Heads of its member organizations (General Assembly). They elect from among themselves a President, a Vice President, and four ordinary members who together represent the EUNIC Board of Directors.

Presidencies
2020-2021:  - DutchCulture, centre for international cooperation 
2019-2020:  - Ministry of Foreign Affairs and International Cooperation (Italy) 
2018-2019:  - French Ministry for Europe and Foreign Affairs 
2017-2018:  - Flanders Department of Foreign Affairs 
2016-2017:  - Danish Cultural Institute

Board of Directors
Members of the Board of Directors of the Danish Presidency: President Michael Metz Morch- Danish Cultural Institute; Vice-President Koen Verlaeckt - Flanders Department of Foreign Affairs; Johannes Ebert - Goethe-Institut; Anne Grillo - French Ministry of Foreign Affairs and International Development; Teresa Indjein - Austrian Federal Ministry for Europe, Integration and Foreign Affairs; Małgorzata Wierzejska - Ministry of Foreign Affairs, Poland
2015-2016:  - Instituto Cervantes 
2014-2015:  - Swedish Institute

Participating members

Members within the EU
Current members of EUNIC (as of September 2020):
 - Federal Ministry for Europe, Integration and Foreign Affairs, Österreich Institut GmbH
 - Wallonie-Bruxelles International, Flemish Department of Foreign Affairs
 - Bulgarian Ministry of Culture
 - Croatia House Foundation
 - Cyprus Ministry of Education & Culture
 - Czech Centres
 - Danish Cultural Institute
 - Estonian Institute
 - Finnish cultural and academic institutes
 - Fondation Alliance française, Institut Français, French Ministry of Foreign Affairs
 - Goethe-Institut, Institute for Foreign Cultural Relations - IFA
 - Hellenic Republic Ministry of Foreign Affairs, Hellenic Foundation for Culture
 - Hungarian Cultural Institute
 - Culture Ireland
 - Società Dante Alighieri, Ministry of Foreign Affairs and International Cooperation (Italy)
 - Latvian Institute
 - Lithuanian Culture Institute
 - Ministry of Foreign Affairs (Luxembourg)
 - Arts Council Malta
 - DutchCulture, centre for international cooperation
 - Ministry of Foreign Affairs of the Republic of Poland
 - Instituto Camões
 - Romanian Cultural Institute
 - Ministry of Foreign and European Affairs of the Slovak Republik
 - Slovenian Ministry of Culture
 - Instituto Cervantes, AECID
 - Swedish Institute
 - British Council

Members outside the EU
EUNIC members are present in the following countries:

 - EUNIC Armenia

See also

 Culture of Europe
 European integration

References

External links

Cultural policies of the European Union
Cross-European advocacy groups
Non-profit organizations based in Europe